Jī was the ancestral name of the Zhou dynasty which ruled China between the 11th and 3rd centuries BC. Thirty-nine members of the family ruled China during this period while many others ruled as local lords, lords who eventually gained great autonomy during the Spring and Autumn and Warring States periods. Ji is a relatively uncommon surname in modern China, largely because its bearers often adopted the names of their states and fiefs as new surnames.

The legendary and historical record shows the Zhou Ji clan closely entwined with the Jiang, who seem to have provided many of the Ji lords' high-ranking spouses. A popular theory in recent Chinese scholarship has suggested that they represented two important clans  the Ji originally centered on the Fen River in Shanxi and the Jiang around the Wen River in Shaanxi  whose union produced the Zhou state ruled by Old Duke Danfu, although the theory remains problematic.

In the family hymns recorded in the Classic of Poetry, the Ji (姬) family is traced from the miraculous birth of the Xia dynasty culture hero and court official Houji caused by his mother's stepping into a footprint left by the supreme god Shangdi. The Records of the Grand Historian instead make Houji the son of the Emperor Ku, descendant of Yellow Emperor.

It is sometimes listed as one of the Eight Great Surnames of Chinese Antiquity, replacing  when present.

Ancient rulers with the surname
Kings of the Zhou dynasty (周朝)
Rulers of the State of Wu (吳), who claimed descent from Taibo
Rulers of Eastern Guo (東虢) and Western Guo (西虢), descended from Jili's two younger sons
Rulers of Han (韓), descended from a son of King Wen of Zhou
Rulers of Teng, descended from a son of King Wen of Zhou
Rulers of Wey (卫), descended from a son of King Wen of Zhou
Rulers of Wei (魏), descended from a son of King Wen of Zhou
Rulers of the State of Liu (劉) from Duke Kang of Liu (劉康公), son of King Qing of Zhou
Rulers of Xing (邢), descended from Pengshu of Xing
Rulers of Cai (蔡), descended from Cai Shu Du
Rulers of Cao, descended from Cao Shu Zhenduo
Rulers of Jin state (晉), descended from Tang Shu Yu
Rulers of Lu (魯), descended from Bo Qin, son of the Duke of Zhou
Rulers of Zheng
Rulers of Han, which claimed descent from Han Wuzi, a grandson of Marquis Mu of Jin
Rulers of Shen (沈), from sons of King Wen of Zhou
Rulers of Xi (息)
Rulers of Yan (燕) from Duke of Shao, brother of King Wu of Zhou
Rulers of Cen (岑), from Viscount Ji Qu, nephew of the Duke of Zhou
Rulers of Xianyu (鮮虞), who dwelt among the Di.

Other notable people

Ji Pengfei (born 1910), a prominent Communist
Ji Shengde, former head of Chinese military intelligence

Other surnames adopted by descendants of Ji
 Any surname derived from the Zhou dynasty Ji-descent vassal states
 Qiū (秋)
 Wēng (翁)
Hóng (洪)
Jiāng (江)
Fāng (方)
Gōng (龚)
 Wāng (汪)

References

Chinese-language surnames
Individual Chinese surnames
Eight Great Surnames of Chinese Antiquity